Amy Judith Levy (10 November 1861 – 9 September 1889) was an English essayist, poet, and novelist best remembered for her literary gifts; her experience as the second Jewish woman at Cambridge University, and as the first Jewish student at Newnham College, Cambridge; her feminist positions; her friendships with others living what came later to be called a "New Woman" life, some of whom were lesbians; and her relationships with both women and men in literary and politically activist circles in London during the 1880s.

Biography

Early life and education 
Levy was born in Clapham, an affluent district of London, on 10 November 1861, to Lewis and Isobel Levy. She was the second of seven children born into a Jewish family with a "casual attitude toward religious observance", who sometimes attended a Reform synagogue in Upper Berkeley Street, the West London Synagogue. As an adult, Levy continued to identify herself as Jewish and wrote for The Jewish Chronicle.

Levy showed an interest in literature from an early age. At 13, she wrote a criticism of Elizabeth Barrett Browning's feminist work Aurora Leigh; at 14, Levy's first poem, "Ida Grey: A Story of Woman's Sacrifice", was published in the journal Pelican. Her family was supportive of women's education and encouraged Amy's literary interests; in 1876, she was sent to Brighton and Hove High School and later studied at Newnham College, Cambridge. Levy was the first Jewish student at Newnham when she arrived in 1879 but left before her final year.

Her circle of friends included Clementina Black, Ellen Wordsworth Darwin, Dollie Radford, Eleanor Marx (daughter of Karl Marx), and Olive Schreiner. While travelling in Florence in 1886, Levy met Vernon Lee, a fiction writer and literary theorist six years her senior, and fell in love with her. Both women went on to explore the themes of sapphic love in their works. Lee inspired Levy's poem "To Vernon Lee".

Literary career 
The Romance of a Shop (1888), Levy's first novel, is regarded as an early "New Woman" novel and depicts four sisters who experience the difficulties and opportunities afforded to women running a business in 1880s London, Levy wrote her second novel, Reuben Sachs (1888), to fill the literary need for "serious treatment ... of the complex problem of Jewish life and Jewish character", which she identified and discussed in a 1886 article "The Jew in Fiction."

Levy wrote stories, essays, and poems for popular or literary periodicals; the stories "Cohen of Trinity" and "Wise in Their Generation", both published in Oscar Wilde's magazine The Woman's World, are among her most notable. In 1886, Levy began writing a series of essays on Jewish culture and literature for The Jewish Chronicle, including The Ghetto at Florence, The Jew in Fiction, Jewish Humour, and Jewish Children.

Levy's works of poetry, including the daring A Ballad of Religion and Marriage, reveal her feminist concerns. Xantippe and Other Verses (1881) includes "Xantippe", a poem in the voice of Socrates's wife; the volume A Minor Poet and Other Verse (1884) includes more dramatic monologues as well as lyric poems. Her final book of poems, A London Plane-Tree (1889), contains lyrics that are among the first to show the influence of French symbolism.

Sexuality 
Levy remains a topic of discussion amongst scholars in terms of whether or not she is to be considered a Victorian Lesbian writer. She had sent several poems to her friend Violet Paget, also known as Vernon Lee, confessing her love. These poems include her famous works "To Vernon Lee" and "New Love, New Life." Both of these pieces express messages of unrequited love to another woman. Scholars continue to debate if these gestures were that of friendship or intense passion.

Death 
Levy experienced episodes of major depression from an early age. In her later years, her depression worsened in connection to her distress surrounding her romantic relationships and her awareness of her growing deafness. On 9 September 1889, two months away from her 28th birthday, she died by suicide "at the residence of her parents ... [at] Endsleigh Gardens" by inhaling carbon monoxide. Oscar Wilde wrote an obituary for her in The Women's World in which he praised her gifts. The first Jewish woman to be cremated in England, her ashes were buried at Balls Pond Road Cemetery in London.

Legacy 
In 1993, Melyvn New produced a compilation of Levy's works, published as The Complete Novels and Selected Writings of Amy Levy: 1861–1889.

Selected works
 Xantippe and Other Verse (1881)
 A Minor Poet and Other Verse (1884)
 The Romance of a Shop (1888) novel (republished in 2005 by Black Apollo Press)
 Reuben Sachs: A Sketch (1888) (republished in 2001 by Persephone Books)
 A London Plane-Tree and Other Verse (1889)
 Miss Meredith (1889; a novel)  
 The Complete Novels and Selected Writings of Amy Levy: 1861–1889 (1993)

Notes

References

Further reading
 Linda Hunt Beckman, Amy Levy: Her Life and Letters. Athens, Ohio: Ohio University Press, 2000. .
 Iveta Jusová, The New Woman and the Empire. Columbus : Ohio State University Press, 2005. .
 Judith Flanders. Inside the Victorian Home: a Portrait of Domestic Life in Victorian England. New York: W. W. Norton, 2006. 
 Susan Bernstein, ed., Reuben Sachs [with introduction and other readings by Levy and others]. Broadview Press, 2006. 
 Susan Bernstein, ed., The Romance of a Shop [with introduction and other readings by Levy and others]. Broadview Press, 2006.

External links

 Hurst, Isobel (17 March 2021). Amy Levy: A London Poet, Rimbaud and Verlaine Foundation
 "Amy Levy: A Tragic Late Victorian Anglo-Jewish Poet and Novelist" at The Victorian Web.
 Amy Levy Chronology at The Victorian Web.
 Amy Levy at the Jewish Women's Archive.
 Some Amy Levy poems on Cordula's Web.
 Poems by Amy Levy.
 MP3 recording of Levy's novel Reuben Sachs: A Sketch from Librivox.org.
 Critical analysis of Levys's work at Enotes.
 
 

1861 births
1889 deaths
1880s suicides
19th-century English novelists
19th-century English poets
19th-century English women writers
Alumni of Newnham College, Cambridge
Burials at Balls Pond Road Cemetery
English deaf people
Deaf poets
Deaf writers
English feminist writers
English Jewish writers
English lesbian writers
English LGBT poets
English women novelists
English women poets
Jewish poets
English LGBT writers
People educated at Brighton and Hove High School
People from Clapham
People with mood disorders
Suicides by carbon monoxide poisoning
Victorian poets
Victorian women writers
Writers from London